The Frank J. Selke Trophy, or simply the Selke Trophy, is awarded annually to the National Hockey League forward who demonstrates the most skill in the defensive component of the game. The winner is selected by a poll of the Professional Hockey Writers' Association following the regular season. Named after Frank J. Selke, former general manager of the  Toronto Maple Leafs and Montreal Canadiens, the trophy has been awarded 44 times to 27 different players since the 1977–78 NHL season.

History
The trophy was first awarded at the end of the 1977–78 NHL season.  It was named after Frank J. Selke, former general manager of the Toronto Maple Leafs and Montreal Canadiens. The Selke Trophy was the fifth and last of the major NHL awards to be introduced that have been named after General Managers and owners of the Original Six teams, the other awards being the Art Ross Trophy, James Norris Memorial Trophy, Conn Smythe Trophy, and Jack Adams Award.

The first recipient was Bob Gainey of the Canadiens, who won the trophy the first four years it was given. Patrice Bergeron of the Boston Bruins has won it more times than any other player, with five wins. Guy Carbonneau, Jere Lehtinen and Pavel Datsyuk are tied for the third-most wins, with three apiece.

The Montreal Canadiens and the Detroit Red Wings have won the trophy the most times, with 7 awards apiece. The team with the greatest number of unique winners are the Red Wings with 4—Sergei Fedorov (twice), Steve Yzerman, Kris Draper, and Datsyuk (three times)—all coming since 1994.

There has been only one instance in which a Selke Trophy winner was also awarded the Hart Memorial Trophy for Most Valuable Player when Sergei Fedorov captured both trophies during the 1993–94 NHL season.  There has not been an instance in which the Art Ross Trophy winner has been awarded the Selke Trophy, though Fedorov finished second in regular season scoring in 1994, while Hart Trophy winner and Art Ross Trophy runner-up Joe Sakic finished second in Selke voting in 2001.  The most points scored in a Selke-winning season is 127 by Doug Gilmour in the 1992–93 NHL season.

Winners

See also
List of National Hockey League awards
List of NHL players
List of NHL statistical leaders
Two-way forward

References

General
Frank J. Selke Trophy at NHL.com
Frank J. Selke Trophy history at Legends of Hockey.net
Specific

National Hockey League trophies and awards
Awards established in 1978